Teesha Nigam (born 21 December) is an Indian playback singer and the sister of famed Bollywood playback singer Sonu Nigam.

Teesha achieved limelight with the song 'Dheera Dheera' from Magadheera, for which she won the Best Debutant Female Singer at Mirchi Awards and the Best Female Playback Singer Awards at the CineMaa Awards. She has sung in numerous Telugu movies including Super, Bujjigadu, Saleem, Sree, Political Rowdy, Gunde Jhallumandi, and Shirdi Sai.She has also sung for multiple Bollywood Films such as Singh Saab The Great,  ShortKut and Wanted.

Early life  
She was born on 21 December in Mumbai to singers Agam Kumar Nigam and Shobha Nigam. Her original name was Neekita Nigam. She is the younger sister of Sonu Nigam.

Discography

Awards

References 

Bollywood playback singers
Indian women playback singers
Singers from Mumbai
Telugu playback singers
Living people
1991 births